David Freeman is an American novelist, screenwriter, playwright, and journalist who studied playwriting and dramatic literature at the Yale Drama School and currently teaches screenwriting seminars in Los Angeles, where he lives with his wife Judith Gingold.

Freeman wrote the last draft for Alfred Hitchcock's final project, The Short Night, a projected spy thriller which was never produced due to Hitchcock's failing health. Freeman wrote about his experiences in the 1984 book The Last Days of Alfred Hitchcock, which includes his completed screenplay.

Filmography (as screenwriter)
The Catcher (TV movie) (1972)
Promise Him Anything (TV movie) (1975)
Heroes (1977) (uncredited)
First Love (1977)
The Border (1982)
Street Smart (1985)

Plays (as playwright)
Jesse and the Bandit Queen
A First Class Man

Bibliography (as author)
It's All True (novel)
One of Us (novel)
A Hollywood Education (short story collection)
The Last Days of Alfred Hitchcock (memoir)

References

External links 
 
 David Freeman profile at the Tribeca Film Institute
 Alfred Hitchcock’s Fade to Black: The Great Director's Final Days April 1982 Esquire magazine article, reprinted in The Daily Beast

American male screenwriters
Living people
20th-century American dramatists and playwrights
American male dramatists and playwrights
20th-century American male writers
Year of birth missing (living people)